Petr Rajlich (born 20 February 1944 in Prague) is a Czech geologist and popularizer of science.

Rajlich published many books and scientific papers mainly oriented to structural end economic geology. He studied at the Faculty of Science, Charles University in Prague, and got a doctoral degree there.

References

External links 
 ResearchGate

Czech geologists
Czech scientists
1944 births
Living people
Charles University alumni
Scientists from Prague